Ismail Khafi  is a Moroccan professional footballer who plays as a forward.

References

1995 births
Living people
Moroccan footballers
Association football forwards
MC Oujda players
2020 African Nations Championship players
Morocco A' international footballers